Giovanni Fiorentino was a 14th-century Florentine writer, to whom is attributed the work Il Pecorone ("The Simpleton"). This was a collection of short stories, purportedly published in 1378. However, this date is disputed.  The attribution, given in the opening sonnet accompanying the collection, is supposed to be spurious although it is mostly retained for convenience.

References

External links

Italian poets
Year of birth unknown
Year of death unknown
Writers from Florence
14th-century people of the Republic of Florence